Firew Altaye Gebremedhin or ፍሬው አልታዬ ገብረመድህን was born on 2 August 1966. He was an Ethiopian politician and second chief administrator of Wolayita Zone, from 2002 to 2004 and he was succeeded by Amanuel Otoro. He served as member of Ethiopian parliament from 2001 to 2002.

Early life 
Firew Altaye was born in Boloso Sore in Wolaita, Ethiopia, and he completed his primary education in Hembecho Saint Michael Missionary School. He also completed his secondary education in wolaita Sodo comprehensive high school. After completing his secondary education, he attended in Addis Ababa University and got first degree in 1990. He got MA degree from University of Amsterdam in International law and until his death he ruled Wolaita zone.

Political career 
Frew Altaye, who was the chief administrator of Wolaytta for a short period of time and designer of everything for the development of the nation. He fought against ethnic chuavinisim which is so called Wogagoda. This event led to widespread protests by all social strata of the Wolaita population in 1998 that eventually resulted in Wolaytta having a zonal status and the recognition of its distinct language in November 2000. Firew fought corruption, Sincere and diligent, courageous and determined development man, developmentalist who put the public interest before his own. Firew Altaye mobilized Wolayita people and built the beautiful and attractive Wolayita Gutara meeting and entertainment hall.

Firew served as officer of Wolayita Zone Justice Department, Chairman of Damot Weyde Woreda Teachers Association, Chairman of the Semen Omo Zone Teachers Association and as well vice-chairman of the Ethiopian Teachers Association. He also served as member of the EPRDF and SEPDM Central Committee, a diplomat at the FDRE Ministry of Foreign Affairs, and Wolayita Zone chief Administrator.

References 

Wolayita
20th-century Ethiopian politicians
People from Wolayita Zone
1966 births
2004 deaths